Chrysococcus elegans is a species of golden algae in the family Dinobryaceae. It is a freshwater species found in North America, specifically the Northwest Territories in Canada.

References

External links
 Chrysococcus elegans at algaebase.org

Chrysophyceae
Species described in 1957